The 1983 Lliga Catalana de Bàsquet was the fourth edition of the Catalan Basketball League. A certain disinterest was detected both in the fans and in the clubs as far as the competition was concerned, as it began to make it difficult to agree with pre-season preparation matches. This competition was the last for Cotonificio to play as a professional team, deleting the section for economic reasons once the ACB league started, where the team would play in Santa Coloma de Gramanet as CB Santa Coloma with the sponsorship of Licor 43, dedicating the socio-cultural Badalonina entity to the practice of training basketball and amateur as one more section.

Group stage

Group A

Group B

Final

References

Lliga Catalana de Bàsquet seasons
 
Spanish